{{DISPLAYTITLE:C24H32O6}}
The molecular formula C24H32O6 (molar mass: 416.50 g/mol, exact mass: 416.219889) may refer to:

 Arenobufagin, a bufanolide steroid
 Deoxyschizandrin
 Desonide, a steroid hormone
 Methylprednisolone acetate, a corticosteroid
 Verrucosidin, a fungal polyketide